Breein Tyree (born January 13, 1998) is an American professional basketball player for Filou Oostende of the BNXT League. He played college basketball for the Ole Miss Rebels.

High school career
Raised in the Somerset section of Franklin Township, Somerset County, New Jersey, Tyree played basketball, football, lacrosse and soccer in high school. He played lacrosse as a freshman for Rutgers Preparatory School in Somerset, New Jersey before suffering a lung contusion. In his sophomore year, Tyree transferred to St. Joseph High School in Metuchen, New Jersey. As a sophomore, he played soccer for the United States at an international youth tournament in Europe, but his mother soon drew him away from the sport. On the football field, Tyree played quarterback and safety for St. Joseph and received several college scholarship offers. Tyree was basketball teammates with Karl-Anthony Towns. As a junior, he averaged 18.8 points, 4.9 assists and 3.3 steals per game and was named Greater Middlesex Conference (GMC) player of the year. In his senior season, Tyree averaged 16.2 points, 4.8 rebounds and 4.5 assists per game. He was named first team all-conference and second team all-state, and led St. Joseph to the Greater Middlesex Conference tournament championship. Tyree was considered a three-star recruit and committed to play college basketball for Ole Miss over offers from Kansas State, UMass and USC, among others.

College career
Tyree became a starter at Ole Miss as a freshman despite playing with a knee injury. He averaged 7.3 points per game as a freshman and helped the team reach the NIT quarterfinals. As a sophomore, Tyree averaged 10.8 points, 2.8 assists and 2.2 rebounds per game on a team that only won 12 games. Tyree scored a season-high 31 points in an 81–71 win against Vanderbilt and was named SEC player of the week on January 7, 2019. He had 31 points on February 23 in an 80–64 win over Georgia and took a knee before tipoff to protest a Confederacy rally in the area. Tyree averaged 17.9 points, 2.9 boards and 2.8 assists per game as a junior. He was named to the First Team All-SEC. After the season, Tyree declared for the 2019 NBA draft but ultimately opted to return. He was one of 24 players invited to the Chris Paul Elite Guard Camp.

On December 14, Tyree scored 34 points in an 82–64 win over Middle Tennessee. Tyree was named SEC player of the week on February 10, 2020, after scoring 38 points in a 84–70 win against South Carolina. The next day, Tyree scored a career-high 40 points and had five rebounds and four assists in a 83–58 win over Mississippi State. At the conclusion of the regular season, Tyree was named to the First Team All-SEC. He averaged 19.7 points, 3.7 rebounds, and 2.5 assists per game as a senior.

Professional career

NBA G League 
After going undrafted in the 2020 NBA draft, Tyree signed with the Miami Heat on November 25, 2020. On December 16, 2020, Tyree was waived by the Heat. On December 19, he was signed and immediately waived by the Toronto Raptors for the purpose of joining their G-League team, Raptors 905, as an affiliate player. On March 1, 2021, Tyree's contract with Raptors 905 ended.

Tyree was re-signed by the Raptors on October 16, 2021, and waived to join the Raptors 905. On January 23, 2022, he was suspended three games by the G League. Tyree was waived on February 7. On February 10, 2022, Tyree was reacquired and activated by the Raptors 905.

Oostende 
He signed with Filou Oostende of the BNXT League on August 2. On September 17, he won the BNXT Supercup with Oostende after scoring 35 points in his debut against Heroes Den Bosch.

Career statistics

College

|-
| style="text-align:left;"| 2016–17
| style="text-align:left;"| Ole Miss
| 34 || 22 || 19.1 || .373 || .310 || .703 || 1.9 || 1.9 || .6 || .0 || 7.3
|-
| style="text-align:left;"| 2017–18
| style="text-align:left;"| Ole Miss
| 32 || 23 || 25.2 || .394 || .356 || .700 || 2.2 || 2.8 || .7 || .3 || 10.8
|-
| style="text-align:left;"| 2018–19
| style="text-align:left;"| Ole Miss
| 33 || 33 || 33.8 || .459 || .375 || .831 || 2.9 || 2.8 || 1.0 || .4 || 17.9
|-
| style="text-align:left;"| 2019–20
| style="text-align:left;"| Ole Miss
| 31 || 30 || 34.6 || .427 || .360 || .822 || 3.7 || 2.5 || 1.3 || .1 || 19.7
|- class="sortbottom"
| style="text-align:center;" colspan="2"| Career
| 130 || 108 || 28.1 || .421 || .356 || .787 || 2.7 || 2.5 || .9 || .2 || 13.8

Personal life
Tyree's father, Mark, was a third-team All-American college lacrosse player for Rutgers and is a 2009 New Jersey Lacrosse Hall of Fame inductee. His older brother, Jevon, is a former cornerback for Rutgers. His cousin, David Tyree, played in the National Football League (NFL) and won Super Bowl XLII with the New York Giants after making the famous Helmet Catch.

References

External links
Ole Miss Rebels bio

1998 births
Living people
American expatriate basketball people in Canada
American men's basketball players
Basketball players from New Jersey
BC Oostende players
Ole Miss Rebels men's basketball players
Point guards
Raptors 905 players
Rutgers Preparatory School alumni
Shooting guards
Sportspeople from Franklin Township, Somerset County, New Jersey
St. Joseph High School (Metuchen, New Jersey) alumni
American expatriate basketball people in Belgium